Filmworks XXIV: The Nobel Prizewinner is a soundtrack album by American composer John Zorn released on Zorn's own label, Tzadik, in 2010 featuring music written and recorded for Dutch film director Timo Veltkamp's's De Nobelprijswinnaar (2010).

Reception

The Allmusic review by Thom Jurek awarded the album 4 stars stating "Perhaps the highest compliment to pay a recording like this is not only to claim that it stands on its own as a piece of music -- because, as in all of Zorn's scores, it does -- but moreover that it is so utterly, cleverly and aesthetically engaging, it creates in the listener the desire to see the film and experience how this music functions within it".

Track listing
All compositions by John Zorn
 "The Nobel Prize Winner" - 4:15 
 "Writer's Block (Ilse's Theme)" - 4:17 
 "The Depraved City" - 5:09 
 "Annabel" - 3:31 
 "Our In-House Dostoevsky" - 4:37 
 "The Search" - 1:56 
 "Dénouement" - 3:24 
 "Door to Door" - 5:04 
 "Suicidal Tendency" - 1:56 
 "Fyodor and Annabel" - 5:10 
 "Plagiarism" - 2:52 
 "Moral and Immoral (take 1)" - 3:08 
 "Ghost of a Guilty Conscience" - 4:40 
 "Joachim West" - 5:02 
 "Moral and Immoral (take 2)" - 3:06

Personnel
Rob Burger - piano
Trevor Dunn - bass
Kenny Wollesen - drums, vibraphone

References

Tzadik Records soundtracks
Albums produced by John Zorn
John Zorn soundtracks
2010 soundtrack albums
Film scores